Jesse Lynn Webb Jr. (December 8, 1923 – April 28, 1956) was Mayor of Baton Rouge, Louisiana. He died in office in an airplane crash in 1956.

Early life
Webb was born on December 8, 1923, to Jesse Lynn Webb and Maude (Borskey) Webb. His father, Jesse L Webb Sr., served as assessor for East Baton Rouge Parish.

Political career
Webb was elected Mayor of Baton Rouge in 1952 and served from 1953 until his death on April 28, 1956, at Lansing, Michigan. Webb was considered a moderate on the issue of racial segregation and under his leadership segregation in public buses was rolled back.

Webb was to attend a meeting in Lansing, Michigan when the aircraft he was flying in, owned by the East Baton Rouge Parish Sheriff's office, crashed while carrying him to a meeting in the Michigan capital. Webb was succeeded in office by his wife, Mary Estus Jones Webb, who served out the remainder of his term.

References

1923 births
1956 deaths
Mayors of Baton Rouge, Louisiana
Victims of aviation accidents or incidents in the United States
Accidental deaths in Michigan
20th-century American politicians
Victims of aviation accidents or incidents in 1956